Rev James Campbell (1789-1861), born in Carsphairn, Kirkcudbrightshire to William Campbell and Agnes, née Riggs, was a Scottish clergyman and established Church of Scotland parish minister of Traquair in Peeblesshire.

Career 
After studying at the University of Glasgow, Campbell was tutor to the family of Robert Nutter Campbell of Kailzie, and to the Hart family of Castlemilk, with whom he travelled extensively throughout continental Europe. In 1820, he was ordained to Traquair parish, serving there for forty-one years until his death, after which his son-in-law, Rev Jardine Wallace, took over as his successor.

Letters from continental Europe 
Rev Campbell's invaluable contribution to Scottish history is the unique series of letters he wrote to his father and family. This correspondence, reposited in Dumfries and currently being digitised and transcribed by the Carsphairn Heritage Initiative charity, describes Campbell's travels to France, Italy, Spain and Holland with the Hart family, detailing their flight from France to Spain during the return to power of Napoleon in France, and discusses his search for a suitable parish and writing of sermons on his return to Edinburgh, 1812-1817.

Toulouse, c. March/April 1815
  

Leghorn (Livorno), 23 September 1815

Account of the parish 
In the mid-1840s, James Campbell contributed a particularly detailed account of his parish in the Peeblesshire section of the New Statistical Account of Scotland.

Family 
James Campbell, son of William Campbell and Agnes, née Riggs, was married to Mary, daughter of Matthew Combe, a Leith brewer. James' daughter Agnes Mary married the latter's successor, Rev Jardine Wallace (1834-1910), editor of Poetical Works of Thomas Aird.

Rev George Campbell (1827-1904) 

James Campbell's son, Rev George Campbell (1827-1904), was the parish minister of Eastwood on the outskirts of Glasgow between 1853 and 1904. George Campbell was privately educated, after which he attended Edinburgh University. During his youth on Tweedside, he was at Abbotsford whilst Sir Walter Scott was still alive, although the two never met since Scott was on the Continent at the time. Like his father, Campbell travelled extensively as a student on the Continent and during the early years of his ministry. This included a trip to Russia along with the Rev Dr Norman Macleod.

After a "distinguished career" at the University of Edinburgh, Campbell went to Rosneath as an assistant clergyman to Rev Robert Story, the father of the Principal of Glasgow University, and in that parish was the driving force behind the erection of a chapel at Craigrownie which later functioned as a parish church. In 1853 he was ordained to Eastwood, the parish he served for more than five decades until his death. In his time a new manse, church, and parish school were erected.> At his induction, Sir John and Lady Matilda Maxwell, George Campbell's patrons, treated him to a "sumptuous banquet" at the Star Hotel, Glasgow, in the presence of numerous clergymen, the service having been conducted by the Rev Andrew Watson of the Abbey, Paisley. Months after his induction, Campbell advertised for a parish schoolmaster for the growing district, "competent to teach all the branches of an English Education, together with Latin and Greek, and at least one Modern Language." A "maximum Salary" was offered for the strenuous position, to which were added duties as the parish's Session Clerk. In 1855, not long after he had started out as a minister, thieves forcibly broke into Eastwood manse and stole a large amount of silver plate and other items, including silver sacramental cups belonging to the church.

In 1865, George Campbell was a co-founder of the Church Service Society, whose purpose it was to study the liturgies of the Christian church and to prepare and publish forms of prayer for public worship and services for the administration of the sacraments in the Church of Scotland, and its members included high-ranking Scottish clergymen. Rev Campbell was the society's treasurer. From 1868 to 1888 he was clerk of Presbytery in Paisley. This demanding duty involved mediating in controversial cases, such as when a zealous minister complained bitterly that a Roman Catholic school was using books of "decidedly Popish character, containing passages of a kind grossly idolatrous, with superstitions historically false, most revolting to the feelings and principles of Protestants, and strongly calculated to prejudice and mislead the infant mind...". During Campbell's ministry, the parish, on the outskirts of Glasgow, grew significantly. Through his energy, several chapels were erected and endowed in Pollokshaws and surroundings. He was active on all public Boards in the parish, and greatly encouraged education via the School Board.

Shortly before Rev Campbell's death, in 1903, a festive dinner was given at Windsor Hall, Glasgow, to celebrate the long-standing minister's jubilee, presided by Dr Robert Stirling Maxwell, MP, and attended, inter alia, by the eminent principal of Glasgow university, Robert Herbert Story, whose father Robert had been parish minister of Rosneath in the period when Campbell had been an assistant prior to his ordination, and the Right Rev John Gillespie (moderator), who said it was “gratifying to find a better spirit prevailing among the different churches compared with the time when their guest was ordained.” Also present was the liturgical scholar Thomas Leishman, of the Church Service Society. At a congregational “conversatione” in Pollokshaws in connection with the jubilee, Rev Campbell was presented with a silver salver and a cheque for £500.

Rev George Campbell is known for his contribution to the parish history of the corner of Glasgow where he spent fifty-one years of his life. The title of his book, Eastwood: notes on the ecclesiastical antiquities of the parish, is confusing insofar as it is mainly a history of the area, named after long-since-vanished wood, from early Celtic Christianisation until the 19th century, and less about the relics and ancient monuments we normally associate with the term “antiquities”. Although these artefacts are mentioned, too, most of the book constitutes a tribute to the many clergymen who served the district over the centuries. Using sources such as Kirk Session records, Campbell does not hesitate to mention negative aspects of Christianity such as stories of witches and the ensuing trials and hangings. As someone who lived in a period when people of modest origin, like Campbell’s minister father James before him, were dependent, beside the Kirk, on the support of baronets if they wanted to enter the ministry, and in doing so, become respected middle class citizens, Campbell does not forget to pay homage to his patrons Sir John and Lady Matilda Maxwell. As a token of appreciation, he tactfully describes in detail the contribution the Maxwell family made to the Pollok/Eastwood district. When Sir John Maxwell of Pollok died in 1865, Rev Campbell held the Presbyterian funeral service at the baronet's mansion, Pollok House.

George's son (Rev James Campbell's grandson) was the Very Rev James Montgomery Campbell, minister of Dumfries, who became Moderator of the General Assembly of the Church of Scotland in 1928.

References

1789 births
1861 deaths
19th-century Scottish clergy